The Santa Ynez Valley AVA is an American Viticultural Area located in Santa Barbara County, California and was established on May 16, 1983 by the Alcohol and Tobacco Tax and Trade Bureau (TTB). It is part of the larger Central Coast AVA, and contains the greatest concentration of wineries in Santa Barbara County.  The valley is formed by the Purisima Hills and San Rafael Mountains to the north and the Santa Ynez Mountains to the south creating a long, east-west corridor with very cool temperatures on the coast that become progressively warmer inland. The Santa Ynez River flows east to west on the valley floor toward the Pacific Ocean.  As of 2021, the Santa Ynez Valley contains four other established viticultural areas:  Sta. Rita Hills on its western boundary; Ballard Canyon and  Los Olivos District occupying the center region; and Happy Canyon on the eastern border. Chardonnay is the most planted grape variety in the cooler, western portion of the valley while Rhône varieties thrive in the eastern locales.

See also 
 Rhône Rangers
 Jalama Wines

References

External links
 Santa Ynez Wine Country Association
 Santa Ynez Valley Santa Barbara Vintners Association
 TTB AVA Map

American Viticultural Areas of California
American Viticultural Areas of Southern California
Geography of Santa Barbara County, California
Santa Ynez Valley
American Viticultural Areas
1983 establishments in California